Michael Dale Huckabee (born August 24, 1955) is an American politician, Baptist minister, and political commentator who served as the 44th governor of Arkansas from 1996 to 2007. He was a candidate for the Republican Party presidential nomination in both 2008 and 2016. 

He is the host of the talk show Huckabee, which ran on the Fox News Channel from 2008 to 2015, and has run on TBN since October 2017. He paused the show in January 2015 in order to explore a potential bid for the presidency. From April 2012 through December 2013, he hosted a daily radio program, The Mike Huckabee Show, on weekday afternoons for Cumulus Media Networks. Huckabee is the author of several best-selling books, co-founder of the Kids Guide to Fighting Socialism, an ordained Southern Baptist minister noted for his evangelical views, a musician, and a public speaker. He was also a political commentator on The Huckabee Report.

In the 2008 Republican presidential primaries, Huckabee won the 2008 Iowa Republican caucuses and finished second in delegate count and third in both popular vote and number of states won, behind John McCain and Mitt Romney. Huckabee ran again for the Republican nomination in the 2016 presidential election, but withdrew early in the primary following a disappointing finish in the Iowa caucus.

Huckabee is the father of Sarah Huckabee Sanders, who is a former White House Press Secretary and the current governor of Arkansas.

Early life
Huckabee was born on August 24, 1955, in Hope, Arkansas, the son of Dorsey Wiles Huckabee (1923–1996) and his wife Mae (Elder) Huckabee (1925–1999), conservative Southern Democrats. Huckabee is of English, German, and Scots-Irish ancestry, with roots in America dating to the Colonial Era. He has cited his working-class upbringing as the reason for his political views; his father worked as a fireman and mechanic, and his mother worked as a clerk at a gas company.

His first job, when he was 14, was at a radio station, where he read the news and weather. He was elected governor of Arkansas by his chapter of the American Legion-sponsored Boys State program in 1972. He was student council vice president at Hope High School during the 1971–72 school year. He was student council president at Hope High School during the 1972–73 school year. He has one sister, Pat Harris, a middle school teacher. He entered the ministry in 1972 at Garrett Memorial Baptist Church in Hope.

Huckabee married Janet McCain on May 25, 1974. He graduated from Ouachita Baptist University on May 8, 1978, completing his bachelor's degree in religion before attending Southwestern Baptist Theological Seminary in Fort Worth, Texas. He dropped out of the seminary after one year in order to take a job in Christian broadcasting.

Pastoral career

At age 21, Huckabee was a staffer for televangelist James Robison. Robison commented, "His convictions shape his character and his character will shape his policies. His whole life has been shaped by moral absolutes." Prior to his political career, he served as pastor at Immanuel Baptist Church in Pine Bluff, Arkansas, from 1980 to 1986, and the Beech Street First Baptist Church in Texarkana, from 1986 to 1992.

Huckabee started 24-hour television stations in both Pine Bluff and Texarkana, where he produced documentaries and hosted a program called Positive Alternatives. He encouraged the all-white Immanuel Baptist Church to accept black members in the mid-1980s. Years later, he wrote about the insights he gained as a minister:

In 1989, Huckabee ran against Ronnie Floyd of Springdale for the presidency of the Arkansas Baptist State Convention. Huckabee won and served as president from 1989 to 1991.

Huckabee has received two honorary doctorates: a Doctor of Humane Letters, received from John Brown University in 1991, and a Doctor of Laws from Ouachita Baptist University in 1992.

Political career

Lieutenant Governor of Arkansas, 1993–1996

In Huckabee's first political race in 1992, he lost to incumbent Democratic senator Dale Bumpers, receiving 40 percent of the vote in the general election. In the same election, Arkansas governor Bill Clinton was elected president, making lieutenant governor Jim Guy Tucker the new governor when Clinton resigned the governorship. In 1993, Republican state chairman Asa Hutchinson urged Huckabee to run in the special election for lieutenant governor held on July 27. Realizing his loss came among key conservative Democrats, Huckabee ran a decidedly conservative campaign. In the subsequent general election, he defeated Nate Coulter, who had been Bumpers's campaign manager the previous year, 51–49 percent. Huckabee became the second Republican since Reconstruction to serve as Arkansas lieutenant governor, the first having been Maurice Britt from 1967 to 1971.

In his autobiography From Hope to Higher Ground, Huckabee recalled the chilly reception that he received from the Arkansas Democratic establishment on his election as lieutenant governor: "The doors to my office were spitefully nailed shut from the inside, office furniture and equipment were removed, and the budget spent down to almost nothing prior to our arriving. After fifty-nine days of public outcry, the doors were finally opened for me to occupy the actual office I had been elected to hold two months earlier."

Dick Morris, who had previously worked for Bill Clinton, advised Huckabee on his races in 1993, 1994, and 1998. Huckabee commented that Morris was a "personal friend". A newspaper article reported on Huckabee's 1993 win: "Morris said the mistake Republicans always make is that they are too much of a country club set. What we wanted to do was run a progressive campaign that would appeal to all Arkansans.'"

Morris elaborated, "So we opened the campaign with ads that characterized Mike as more of a moderate whose values were the same as those of other Arkansans." Consequently, he abandoned his earlier support for the Council of Conservative Citizens (CofCC) when in April 1994 following an adverse media campaign against the CofCC, Huckabee withdrew from a speaking engagement before their national convention. He repeated the accusations made by various media and civil rights organizations such as the Southern Poverty Law Center recalling his past association with the CofCC saying, "I will not participate in any program that has racist overtones. I've spent a lifetime fighting [against] racism and anti-Semitism."

In 1994, Huckabee was re-elected to a full term as lieutenant governor, beating Democratic candidate Charlie Cole Chaffin with nearly 59 percent of the vote. While lieutenant governor, Huckabee accepted $71,500 in speaking fees and traveling expenses from a nonprofit group, Action America. R. J. Reynolds was the group's largest contributor.

In October 1995, David Pryor announced that he was retiring from the United States Senate. Huckabee then announced he was running for the open seat and moved ahead in the polls, but ultimately dropped out of the race to lead the state after incumbent governor Jim Guy Tucker resigned following his fraud and conspiracy convictions.

During his campaign, Huckabee opposed in December then-governor Tucker's plan for a constitutional convention. The plan was defeated by voters, 80–20 percent, in a special election. In January 1996, Huckabee campaigned in televised ads paid for by the Republican National Committee and the Arkansas Republican Party against a highway referendum. Tucker supported the referendum, which included tax increases and a bond program, to improve  of highway. On the referendum, the bond question, which included a sales tax increase and a gas tax increase, lost 87–13 percent. A second question, a five-cent increase on diesel tax, lost 86–14 percent. Huckabee also opposed Tucker's plan for school consolidation.

Governor of Arkansas, 1996–2007

In May 1996, Tucker was convicted "on one count of arranging nearly $3 million in fraudulent loans" as part of the Whitewater controversy. The Arkansas Constitution, like nearly all state constitutions in the United States, does not allow convicted felons to hold office. Tucker thus promised to resign by July 15. Huckabee then announced he would quit the Senate race and instead fill the unexpired term of Tucker. However, Tucker, insisting he had a strong case for appeal, rescinded his resignation as Huckabee was preparing to be sworn in on July 15. Within a few hours, Tucker reinstated his resignation after Huckabee and the legislature threatened to initiate impeachment proceedings against Tucker. Huckabee was then duly sworn in as governor.

In November 1998, Huckabee was elected to a full four-year term by defeating retired colonel Gene McVay in the primary and Jonesboro attorney Bill Bristow in the general election, becoming the state's third elected Republican governor since Reconstruction.
According to a CNN exit poll, Huckabee received 48% of the African American vote in his 1998 election; but some experts have questioned whether those numbers are a representative sample on how he did on the whole in the election.

In 2001, Huckabee was named "Friend of a Taxpayer" by Americans for Tax Reform for his cut in statewide spending.

In November 2002, Huckabee was reelected to his 2nd 4-year term by defeating State Treasurer Jimmie Lou Fisher, garnering 53 percent of the vote. His reelection came despite the defeat in the general election of fellow Republican U.S. Senator Tim Hutchinson.

Huckabee received widespread praise for his state's rapid response to Hurricane Katrina. In 2005, Time named him one of the five best governors in the U.S., writing "Huckabee has approached his state's troubles with energy and innovation" and referred to him as "a mature, consensus-building conservative who earns praise from fellow Evangelicals and, occasionally, liberal Democrats." Governing magazine likewise honored Huckabee as one of its 2005 Public Officials of the Year. Additionally, he was among those legislators given the APHA Distinguished Public Health Legislator of the Year Award by the American Public Health Association for that same year.

In 2006, he was presented with AARP's Impact Award for his health initiatives.

In December 2008, Huckabee became a honorary member of Tau Kappa Epsilon fraternity. He said that did not have time to join a fraternity in college because he had to "cram four years into a little more than two". The fraternity's CEO said they were "very impressed with his character and the initiatives he headed" as governor.

By the end of his term, Huckabee held the 3rd-longest tenure of any Arkansas governor. Only Democrats Orval Faubus, who served 6 consecutive 2-year terms (1955–1967), and Bill Clinton, who served 11 years, 11 months (1979–1981; 1983–1992), had longer tenures.

During his tenure as governor, Huckabee supported a net tax increase of $505 million. According to columnist Margaret Carlson, that money was used to improve roads, health care and schools in the state.

Clemencies

As governor, Huckabee commuted and accepted recommendations for pardon for twice as many sentences as his 3 predecessors combined; in total: 1,033 prisoners. Twelve had previously been convicted of murder. Though Huckabee pardoned more than his predecessors, the state prison size and number of people executed were greater as well, Huckabee denied 92% of all clemency requests during his 10.5 years as governor. Most pardons and commutations were not for prisoners but for those whose sentences had ended and who were seeking work. Huckabee's pardons and commutations became an issue during the 2008 Republican Primary, with most of the controversy focusing on Wayne Dumond.

Huckabee's handling of clemency petitions received national attention in November 2009 with the case of Maurice Clemmons, who had committed burglary without a weapon at 16. The Prison Transfer Board unanimously requested a sentence commutation for Clemmons as did the trial judge. Clemmons's 60-year sentence was commuted by Huckabee to 47 years, making him eligible for parole if approved by the parole board. After parole in 2000, Clemmons was arrested for multiple offenses including child molestation and aggravated assault but was released after prosecutors declined to file charges. After Clemmons murdered four police officers in Lakewood, Washington, a two-day manhunt ensued, and Clemmons was shot and killed by a Seattle Police Department officer after refusing police orders to stop charging the officer. In his book about the shooting, The Other Side of Mercy, Jonathan Martin of The Seattle Times wrote that Huckabee apparently failed to review Clemmons's prison file, which was "thick with acts of violence and absent indications of rehabilitation". Huckabee defended his actions, stating that the recommendation to reduce the sentence was unanimous and supported by the trial judge, that the decision to parole him was made by the parole board, not him, and that Clemmons had been re-arrested and the decision not to file charges then had nothing to do with him.

2008 presidential election campaign

Huckabee announced his run for the White House on Meet the Press on January 28, 2007.

At the August 11 Iowa Straw Poll, Huckabee took second place with 2,587 votes, roughly 18 percent, splitting the conservative Republican party votes amongst other candidates. Huckabee spent $57.98 per vote in the Straw Poll, which is the lowest among the top three finishers. Huckabee drew attention with an unconventional ad featuring Chuck Norris. In a later ad Huckabee wished voters a merry Christmas, and said that "what really matters is the celebration of the birth of Christ."

In November 2007, Huckabee drew endorsements from a large number of religious activists, including Billy McCormack, a pastor in Shreveport, Louisiana, and a director and vice president of the Christian Coalition of America, founded in 1988 by a previous presidential candidate, Pat Robertson. He was criticized for using a bookshelf that resembled a cross in a Christmas commercial as a form of signaling to Christians, and laughed them off saying "I will confess this: If you play the spot backwards, it says, 'Paul is dead. Paul is dead.'" He also faced a "drumbeat" of questions about the role of faith in his gubernatorial administration and about past statements he made in 1998 about the U.S. being a "Christian nation" in which he said, "I hope we answer the alarm clock and take this nation back for Christ." Huckabee told NBC that his comment was not politically incorrect and was "appropriate to be said to a gathering of Southern Baptists". Huckabee has credited God with some of his political success.

On January 3, 2008, Huckabee won the Iowa Republican caucuses, receiving 34% of the electorate and 17 delegates, compared with the 25% of Mitt Romney, who finished second, receiving 12 delegates; Fred Thompson, who came in third place and received three delegates; John McCain, who came in fourth place and received three delegates; and Ron Paul, who came in fifth place and received two delegates.

On January 8, 2008, Huckabee finished in third place in the New Hampshire primary, behind John McCain in first place, and Mitt Romney who finished second, with Huckabee receiving one more delegate for a total of 18 delegates, gained via elections, and 21 total delegates, versus 30 total (24 via elections) for Romney, and 10 for McCain (all via elections).

On January 15, 2008, Huckabee finished in third place in the Michigan Republican primary, 2008, behind John McCain in second place; Mitt Romney, who finished first; and ahead of Ron Paul, who finished in fourth place.

On January 19, 2008, Huckabee finished in second place in the South Carolina Republican primary, 2008, behind John McCain, who finished first and ahead of Fred Thompson, who finished third.

On January 29, 2008, Huckabee finished in fourth place in the Florida primary, behind Rudy Giuliani in third, Mitt Romney in second, and John McCain in first place.

On January 21, 2008, Huckabee received the endorsement of 50 African American leaders in Atlanta, Georgia. The endorsers cited Huckabee's record on life, education, minorities, the economy, the prison system, and immigration as Arkansas governor. However, NBC reported that the endorsement of African American leaders at the Atlanta event was 36, and "most of them connected to conservative religious organizations".

On February 5, 2008, Huckabee won the first contest of "Super Tuesday", the West Virginia GOP state convention, but only after the McCain campaign provided their delegates, thereby giving Huckabee 52% of the electorate to Mitt Romney's 47%. Backers of rival John McCain said they threw Huckabee their support to prevent Mitt Romney from capturing the winner-take-all GOP state convention vote. Consequently, he also registered victories in Alabama, Arkansas, Georgia and Tennessee on Super Tuesday, bringing his delegate count up to 156, compared with 689 for Republican party front-runner John McCain.

On February 9, 2008, Huckabee won the first election following Super Tuesday, by winning 60% of the vote in the Kansas Republican Caucuses.
This was also the first contest to be held without Mitt Romney, who was said to be splitting the conservative vote with Huckabee. Huckabee also won the Louisiana Republican Primary with 44% of the vote to John McCain's 43% in second. Although Huckabee won the primary he was not awarded any delegates, because of state party rules that stated a candidate must pass the 50% threshold to receive the state's pledged delegates.

On March 4, 2008, Huckabee withdrew from seeking the candidacy as it became apparent he would lose in Texas, where he had hoped to win, and that John McCain would get the 1,191 delegates required to win the Republican nomination. Huckabee finished the race with 240 pledged delegates.

Vice presidential candidate speculation

Even though Huckabee had signed a television contract and a book deal with a pressing deadline, he was mentioned by most to be on then-presumptive Republican presidential nominee John McCain's short list for his vice presidential running mate. The late pundit Tim Russert even referred to Huckabee as "Vice President Huckabee" several times when he appeared on Meet The Press on May 18, 2008. Huckabee was eventually passed over for Sarah Palin.

Former president Bill Clinton has praised Huckabee and stated that he is a rising star in the Republican Party. Clinton and Huckabee have collaborated on initiatives such as the fight against childhood obesity. Former Tennessee Republican Party chairman and Huckabee's former campaign manager Chip Saltsman has called Governor Huckabee, "The most successful failed presidential candidate in the history of our country".

Speculated 2012 presidential campaign

In a November 19, 2008, article by the Associated Press, Huckabee addressed the possibility of running for president in 2012. He said, "I'm not ruling anything out for the future, but I'm not making any specific plans."

Amid speculation about a future run for the Presidency, a CNN poll in December 2008 found Huckabee at the top of the list of 2012 GOP contenders, along with former Alaskan governor Sarah Palin, fellow 2008 presidential candidate Mitt Romney, and former Speaker of the House Newt Gingrich.

On December 3, 2008, Cincinnati-based NBC affiliate WLWT asked Huckabee about the prospect of running, to which he said, "I'm pretty sure I'll be out there. Whether it's for myself or somebody else I may decide will be a better standard bearer, that remains to be seen."

A June 2009 CNN/Opinion Research Corporation national poll showed Huckabee as the 2012 presidential co-favorite of the Republican electorate along with Palin and Romney. An October 2009 poll of Republicans by Rasmussen Reports put Huckabee in the lead with 29%, followed by Romney on 24% and Palin on 18%. In a November 2009 Gallup poll, Huckabee was shown as the leading Republican contender for 2012. In November 2010 CNN projected in a poll that Huckabee would defeat Barack Obama in a hypothetical 2012 contest. In a Rasmussen poll taken January 11–14, 2011, Huckabee was even with Obama at 43% each.

Huckabee took stances opposed to the nature of the incumbent president, Barack Obama. In comments made March 1, 2011, on The Steve Malzberg Show, Huckabee said of Obama, "I would love to know more. What I know is troubling enough. And one thing that I do know is his having grown up in Kenya, his view of the Brits, for example, is very different than the average American." (This is a reference to the Mau Mau Uprising against the colonial rule of the United Kingdom in 1952; Obama himself has never lived in Kenya.)

On May 14, 2011, Huckabee announced on his FNC show that he would not be a candidate for the GOP presidential nomination in 2012. Despite his high national poll numbers and being seen by many as the front runner, Huckabee declined to run, saying, "All the factors say 'go,' but my heart says 'no.'"

2016 presidential campaign

Political commentators speculated that Huckabee might be ready for another presidential run in 2016. He was limited by a lack of money in 2008 but with changes to federal election law allowing SuperPACs to pour large sums of money into a race he might be better positioned to stay in the race. Huckabee has in addition earned personal wealth since 2008 on the lecture circuit and his TV and radio shows. He ended his daily radio show in December 2013, which strengthened speculations about a presidential bid.

Huckabee indicated in September 2014 that he would make the decision on whether to run early in 2015. In January 2015, Huckabee ended his show on FNC to prepare for his possible run in the 2016 presidential election. On March 30, 2015, Huckabee supporters launched a Super PAC to make preparations for his run for the Presidential ticket in 2016.

On May 5, 2015, in his hometown of Hope, Arkansas, Huckabee announced a campaign to seek the Republican nomination for president of the United States in the 2016 election. In his speech, Huckabee attacked trade deals that he said drive down U.S. wages, opposed raising the age for Social Security benefits, criticized President Obama for what he said was putting more pressure on Israel than Iran, and made an unusual plea for donations of $15 or $25 a month, saying: "I will ask you to give something in the name of your children and grandchildren."

On February 1, 2016, after a disappointing showing in the Iowa caucus Huckabee decided that he was going to suspend his campaign.

2018 Florida gubernatorial elections
Reports emerged in the summer of 2016 that Huckabee, who currently lives in Florida, was considering running for governor of Florida in 2018 to succeed term limited Republican incumbent Rick Scott. However, Huckabee later announced that he was declining to run in the 2018 Florida Gubernatorial election. Had he run and won, he would have become the first person to serve as governor of two separate states since Sam Houston, who served as governor of Tennessee and later as governor of Texas. Before his announcement not to run, an August 2016 poll of Florida Republicans conducted by StPetePolls.org showed Huckabee leading a field of potential Republican gubernatorial candidates with 37%.

Trump administration
Following the 2016 U.S. presidential election, Huckabee met with President of the United States Donald Trump, whom he had supported for the Republican nomination after ending his own campaign in February. It was reported by The Daily Mail and The Jerusalem Post that Trump offered Huckabee the position of United States Ambassador to Israel. Huckabee denied the reports. He told Fox News that a possible cabinet appointment for himself was discussed but that he turned the offer down, saying, "I'm not sure it was the right fit."

His daughter Sarah Huckabee Sanders served as White House press secretary to President Donald Trump from July 2017 until July 2019.

In January 2018, Huckabee praised Doha, Qatar as being "surprisingly beautiful, modern, and hospitable" after a trip there, but did not reveal that a foreign agent for Qatar had paid $50,000 to a corporation run by Huckabee as a "honorarium for visit".

Following Trump's defeat by Joe Biden in the 2020 presidential election, Huckabee supported Trump's legal challenges in closely contested states, stating, "I think he owes it to all of us to make sure the election was fair. I am not saying it wasn't, I don't know. But we need to know, we have to have an answer to the questions that linger." On November 15, in a letter addressed to Joe Biden first posted on his website, Huckabee made unsubstantiated claims of election fraud in the 2020 election.

Media career
On June 12, 2008, Fox News announced it was hiring Huckabee as a political commentator and regular contributor to their 2008 American presidential election coverage, in their New York election headquarters.

Huckabee filled in for Paul Harvey in July 2008. A few months later, he signed a deal with ABC Radio Networks (now Cumulus Media Networks) to carry a daily commentary, The Huckabee Report, beginning in January 2009. After Harvey's death his show replaced Harvey's broadcasts. On April 15, 2015, Huckabee announced that The Huckabee Report would be ending May 1, but subscribers could hear similar content that they would pay for.

Huckabee hosted a weekend show, Huckabee, on Fox News Channel, which premiered Saturday, September 27, 2008, at 8 PM EST. For six weeks in summer 2010, Fox test-ran The Huckabee Show for the syndicated market; Huckabee was joined by guest co-hosts in the daily spin-off, among them Bob Barker of The Price Is Right fame. Huckabee ended on January 3, 2015, so that Huckabee could consider the possibility of running for president.

On April 2, 2012, Huckabee launched a long-form daily talk show on Cumulus Media Networks, who provide the call-in guests. The show, which is targeted at second-tier broadcast stations, features long-form interviews and discussions and airs in the noon to 3 p.m. time slot, directly opposite the market leader in talk radio, The Rush Limbaugh Show. On November 27, 2013, Huckabee announced that the show will have its final broadcast on December 12, 2013, stating that he and Cumulus Media mutually decided not to renew the contract.

In a December 2013 interview, Huckabee stated that he would be launching a news organization in partnership with Christian Media Corp. International.

In October 2017, the Huckabee show was relaunched, now produced by and aired on the Trinity Broadcasting Network.

Political positions

Abortion

Huckabee opposes any public funding for abortion, and believes that abortion should be legal only when the life of the mother is at risk. He believes that it would "most certainly" be a good day for America if Roe v. Wade were reversed.

Health care

Huckabee opposed Obama's health care plan, the Patient Protection and Affordable Care Act. He stated that he wants to "give citizens more control over their own health care choices".

Free trade

In his book From Hope to Higher Ground, Huckabee expressed support for free trade, but only if it is "fair trade." He identified excess litigation, excess taxation, and excess regulation as three factors contributing to the loss of American jobs, and has proposed economic sanctions on China.

Race relations

According to a CNN exit poll, Huckabee won 48% of African American votes in his successful 1998 gubernatorial race in Arkansas. The 48% figure is often disputed due to the exit poll's small sample size. Huckabee says that it is important for Republicans such as himself to reach out to black voters, and in 2015, he ramped up efforts to win those votes.

In 2015, on an episode of Meet the Press, Huckabee stated that the confederate flag issue was for South Carolinians to decide, "not an issue for a person running for president", and days later, he congratulated Gov. Nikki Haley on her decision to support the removal of the flag from the state capitol. Huckabee gave a speech at the 2008 Republican National Convention that included this: "I say with sincerity that I have great respect for Senator Obama's historic achievement to become his party's nominee—not because of his color, but with indifference to it. Party or politics aside, we celebrate this milestone because it elevates our country."

LGBT rights

Huckabee believes that marriage is between one man and one woman, and he opposes both same-sex marriage and civil unions. In 2006, he outlawed same-sex marriage in Arkansas, but in 2007 he stated that Americans should "respect" gay couples. He says that adoptions should be child focused and opposes "gay adoptions". Huckabee, expounding upon his view on homosexuality, said the following: 

In January 2015, he compared homosexuality to "drinking and swearing", insofar as it is "part of a lifestyle". Huckabee has stated he has gay friends, saying, "People can be my friends who have lifestyles that are not necessarily my lifestyle. I don't shut people out of my circle or out of my life because they have a different point of view[.]"

Women

In comments which he made on March 4, 2011, on the Michael Medved Show, Huckabee spoke about pregnant, unwed actress Natalie Portman, saying "it's unfortunate we glorify and glamorize the idea of out of wedlock children."

In January 2014, in a luncheon speech at the Republican National Committee's winter meeting, in response to a federal mandate on contraception, Huckabee stated that "Democrats want to insult the women of America by making them believe that they are helpless without Uncle Sugar coming in and providing for them a prescription each month for birth control, they cannot control their libido or their reproductive system without the help of the government."

Role of religion in public life

Huckabee has voiced his belief in intelligent design and he has also stated that he does not believe that Darwin's theory of evolution is valid. In July 2004, he was quoted on Arkansans Ask, his regular show on the Arkansas Educational Television Network: "I think that students also should be given exposure to the theories not only of evolution but to the basis of those who believe in creationism."

In April 2011, Huckabee said, "I almost wish that there would be a simultaneous telecast and all Americans would be forced, at gunpoint, to listen to every David Barton message," in praise of the Christian revisionist author David Barton.

Within hours of the Sandy Hook Elementary School shooting, Huckabee made headlines in the U.S. and abroad for stating on Fox News: "We ask why there is violence in our schools, but we have systematically removed God from our schools," and he further asked, "Should we be so surprised that schools would become a place of carnage?"

In September 2014, Huckabee said, "Fire the ones who refuse to hear not only our hearts, but God's heart" (for which he was criticized by Richard Dawkins).

In September 2015, speaking about his support of religious freedom on behalf of Kentucky county clerk Kim Davis to radio host Michael Medved, Huckabee said, "Michael, the Dred Scott decision of 1857 still remains to this day the law of the land which says that black people aren't fully human. Does anybody still follow the Dred Scott Supreme Court decision?" (The decision in Dred Scott v. Sandford had been superseded by the Civil Rights Act of 1866 and nullified by the Thirteenth and Fourteenth Amendments to the U.S. Constitution.)

In June 2016, Huckabee, along with actor Pat Boone and executive producer Troy Duhon, all of whom were involved in the film God's Not Dead 2, sent a letter to California governor Jerry Brown opposing Senate Bill 1146, which "prohibits a person from being subjected to discrimination" at California colleges. Other than religious schools—those that train pastors and theology teachers—schools "might no longer be allowed to hire Christian-only staff, teach religious ideas in regular classes, require attendance at chapel services or keep bathrooms and dormitories restricted to either males or females."

Military

In 2007, Huckabee argued for a larger military and an increase in defense spending, writing, "Right now, we spend about 3.9 percent of our GDP on defense, compared with about six percent in 1986, under President Ronald Reagan. We need to return to that six percent level."

Immigration

During his bid for president, Huckabee released a nine-point immigration enforcement and border security plan. His plan included building a border fence, increased border patrol personnel, and increased visas for skilled workers who enter the country legally. He has previously stated he is opposed to using military resources for border patrol. Huckabee's plan also required all 11–12 million undocumented immigrants to register with the federal government and return to their home countries within 120 days. Failure to do so would carry a 10-year ban from entering the US.

Gun control

Huckabee has voiced his support for self-defense and the Castle Doctrine, and has generally taken an anti-gun control stance. He believes that the concealed carrying of weapons should be allowed.

Fiscal policy

As governor of Arkansas, Huckabee received grades of B in 1998, C in 2000, C in 2002, D in 2004, and F in 2006 from the Cato Institute, a libertarian think tank, in their biennial Fiscal Policy Report Card on America's Governors.

Public image 
Huckabee has both detractors and defenders, even among Republicans. Personality descriptions range from friendly, charming and warm, to petty and aloof. He has received support from African-American leaders, praise from a liberal New York Times columnist, criticism from gay rights groups and pundits. Huckabee has made controversial public statements that have brought criticism. He apologized for at least three statements and has admitted that his love for metaphors and tendency to use hyperbole to make a point has backfired on him.

Personal life

Music

Huckabee plays the electric bass guitar in his classic-rock cover band, Capitol Offense. The group has played for political events and parties, including entertaining at unofficial inaugural balls in Washington, D.C., in January 2001.

In 2007, Huckabee was given the Music for Life Award by the National Association of Music Merchants for his music education advocacy.

Organizations
Huckabee was made the chair of the Southern Governors' Association in 1999 and served in capacity through 2000. He has chaired the Southern Growth Policies Board, the Southern Regional Education Board, the Southern Technology Council, the Interstate Oil and Gas Compact Commission, and the Education Commission of the States. He is also a member of the Republican Governors Association and former chairman of the National Governors Association. Huckabee is chairman of the conservative political action committees Vertical Politics Institute and Huck PAC.

In July 2010, Huckabee became a fundraiser on behalf of for-profit Victory University in Memphis, Tennessee, and was designated Chancellor of the Victory University Foundation.

Weight loss and advocacy of good health
When he was elected governor of Arkansas, Huckabee was obese. In 2003, physicians diagnosed him with type 2 diabetes, and they also informed him that he would not live more than 10 years if he did not lose weight. Huckabee acknowledges that he has weighed as much as 300 pounds (135 kg). Coupled with the death of former Governor Frank D. White (whose obesity contributed to a fatal heart attack) his diagnosis prompted Huckabee to begin eating healthier and exercising. He subsequently lost over 110 pounds (50 kg). The New York Times called the weight loss so rapid that "it was as if he simply unzipped a fat suit and stepped out."

Although Huckabee has stated that he never smoked and he never drank alcohol, he declared himself a "recovering foodaholic". Huckabee has publicly recounted his previous burdens as an obese man: the steps of the Arkansas capitol from the entrance of the building up to the Governor's office were so long and steep that he would be out of breath and exhausted by the time he reached the top of the stairs. Huckabee has discussed his weight loss and used health care reform as a major focus of his governorship.

At an August 2007 forum on cancer which was hosted by Lance Armstrong, Huckabee said that he would support the imposition of a federal smoking ban, but since then, he has stated that he believes that the issue is best addressed by state and local governments.

Huckabee has completed several marathons: the 2005 Marine Corps Marathon, the 2005 and 2006 Little Rock Marathon, and the 2006 New York City Marathon. The 2005 Little Rock Marathon featured an impromptu challenge between Huckabee and Iowa Governor Tom Vilsack. Huckabee completed the marathon in 4:38:31, defeating Vilsack by 50 minutes. He wrote a book chronicling his weight-loss experience, Quit Digging Your Grave with a Knife and Fork. Huckabee was one of 10 recipients of a 2006 AARP Impact Award acknowledging his work as a "health crusader".

In 2009, Huckabee acknowledged that he had gained back a quarter of his weight due to a foot condition that prevented him from running.

Bibliography
 
Huckabee has written or co-authored several books including Do The Right Thing: Inside the Movement That's Bringing Common Sense Back to America (released on November 18, 2008) which became a New York Times Best Seller, Quit Digging Your Grave with a Knife and Fork and God, Guns, Grits, and Gravy.
  a memoir (inspired by the crisis surrounding the incidents prior to his taking office as governor)
  a book about juvenile violence (inspired by the Jonesboro massacre, which took place during his tenure as governor)
  a guide for leaving a personal legacy
  a health and exercise inspirational guide (based on his personal health experience)
 
 "De-Marketing Obesity" in the California Management Review, (with Brian Wansink), 47:4 (Summer 2005), 6–18.
 Huckabee also wrote the foreword to My Story Your Story His Story (2006) by Larry Toller
 Governor Huckabee also wrote the Foreword for "With Christ in Voting Booth" by David Shedlock
 
 
 
 
 
  Huckabee discusses the myriad differences he's seen between those who live in the blue, coastal "bubbles" and the "bubbas" of the red flyover states. Huckabee uses Jay-Z and Beyoncé as examples of a "culture of crude". He describes Beyoncé's lyrics as "obnoxious and toxic mental poison".

See also
 List of governors of Arkansas
 Electoral history of Mike Huckabee
 Republican Party presidential candidates, 2016

References

Further reading

External links

 
 
 Campaign contributions at OpenSecrets.org
 Profile in the Encyclopedia of Arkansas History & Culture
 
 

|-

|-

|-

|-

|-

|-

Mike Huckabee
1955 births
Living people
20th-century American guitarists
20th-century American non-fiction writers
20th-century American politicians
20th-century Baptist ministers from the United States
21st-century American non-fiction writers
21st-century American politicians
21st-century Baptists
American anti-abortion activists
American Christian writers
American Christian Young Earth creationists
American Christian Zionists
American conservative talk radio hosts
American evangelicals
American gun rights activists
American health activists
American health and wellness writers
American male non-fiction writers
American memoirists
American political commentators
American political writers
American rock bass guitarists
American television talk show hosts
American anti-same-sex-marriage activists
Baptist writers
Baptists from Arkansas
Candidates in the 2008 United States presidential election
Candidates in the 2016 United States presidential election
Florida Republicans
Fox News people
Republican Party governors of Arkansas
Guitarists from Arkansas
Intelligent design advocates
Lieutenant Governors of Arkansas
Ouachita Baptist University alumni
People from Hope, Arkansas
Right-wing populism in the United States
Southern Baptist ministers
Victory University
Writers from Arkansas
20th-century American male writers
21st-century American male writers
People with type 2 diabetes